The 2015–16 George Washington Colonials men's basketball team represented George Washington University during the 2015–16 NCAA Division I men's basketball season. The Colonials, led by fifth year head coach Mike Lonergan, played their home games at the Charles E. Smith Center and were members of the Atlantic 10 Conference. They finished the season 28–10, 11–7 in A-10 play to finish in fifth place. They defeated Saint Louis in the second round of the A-10 tournament to advance to the quarterfinals where they lost to Saint Joseph's. They received an invitation to the National Invitation Tournament. As a #4 seed, they defeated Hofstra, Monmouth, and Florida to advance to the semifinals at Madison Square Garden. At MSG, they defeated San Diego State and Valparaiso to become the 2016 NIT champions.

On September 17, 2016, following an investigation into allegations of verbal abuse of his players, head coach Mike Lonergan was fired. He finished at George Washington with a five-year record of 97–70.

Previous season
The Colonials finished the 2014–15 season 22–13, 10–8 in A-10 play to finish in a three way tie for sixth place. They advanced to the quarterfinals of the A-10 tournament where they lost to Rhode Island. They were invited to the National Invitation Tournament where they defeated Pittsburgh in the first round before losing in the second round to Temple.

Departures

Incoming transfers

Incoming recruits

Roster

Rankings

Accolades

Honors and awards
Tyler Cavanaugh
All-Atlantic 10 (2nd team) 
Academic Academic All-Conference 

Patricio Garino
All-Atlantic 10 (2nd team) 
All-Atlantic 10 Defensive team 
Academic Academic All-Conference 
Team Argentina 2016 Summer Olympics

Alex Mitola
Academic Academic All-Conference

Records
Team
Winningest team in program history (28-10) 
First postseason championship in program history (2016 NIT Champions)

Schedule

|-
!colspan=9 style="background:#00285C; color:#EECFA1;"| Exhibition

|-
!colspan=9 style="background:#00285C; color:#EECFA1;"| Non-conference regular season

|-
!colspan=9 style="background:#00285C; color:#EECFA1;"| Atlantic 10 regular season

|-
!colspan=9 style="background:#00285C; color:#EECFA1;"| Atlantic 10 tournament

|-
!colspan=9 style="background:#00285C; color:#EECFA1;"| NIT

See also
 2015–16 George Washington Colonials women's basketball team

References

George Washington Colonials men's basketball seasons
George Washington
George Washington
National Invitation Tournament championship seasons